Sergey Semyonovich Zorin (born Sergey Gumberg; 1890 – 10 September 1937), was the party's First Secretary of the Leningrad City Committee, roughly equating to that of mayor. He held the position between November 1919 and February 1921. As such, he hosted the 2nd World Congress of the Comintern.

Life 
Sergey Semyonovich Gumberg was born in Ukraine. His father was a rabbi in Elizavetgrad and his brother, Alexander Gumberg emigrated to the United States in 1902. Sergey followed him in 1911 staying  in New York. Here he became active in the Socialist Party of America. He supported himself as an unskilled labourer before returning in March 1917 with Trotsky aboard the SS Kristianiafjord.

He was married to Lisa Zorin, with whom he hosted Emma Goldman during her stay in Russia from January 17, 1920 to December 1921.

Zorin aligned himself with the Left Opposition. He travelled to Ivanova with Alexander Voronsky in 1927, which was used as a pretext for the Voronsky's expulsion from the Communist Party.

He was arrested on 1 January 1935, and sentenced to 5 years' imprisonment on 26 March that year in the Monastery of Saint Euthymius, then a prison in Suzdal. He was shot on 10 September 1937.

References 

1890 births
1937 deaths
Politicians from Kropyvnytskyi
First secretaries in non-national subdivisions of the Soviet Union
Jews executed by the Soviet Union
Jewish socialists
Jews from the Russian Empire
Ukrainian Jews
Ukrainian Trotskyists
Great Purge victims from Ukraine
Left Opposition